Tanguingui (variously Tanguingui Islet and historically Isla Tanguingui) is a small, uninhabited island in the Visayan Sea of the Philippines. The island is under the jurisdiction of the municipality of Madridejos, Cebu. There is a lighthouse on the island.

Location and geography 
Tanguingui is a small cay in the Visayan Sea.

Lighthouse
According to the Faros Españoles de Ultramar, Tanguingui was one of the 27 major lighthouses of the Philippines during the Spanish occupation of the Philippines. In 1903, the US government built a  lighthouse on Tanguingui.

See also 

 Lighthouses in the Philippines
 List of islands in the Philippines
 Desert island

References 

Islands of Cebu
Uninhabited islands of the Philippines